Schizogenius amphibius is a species of ground beetle in the family Carabidae. It is found in North America.

References

Further reading

External links

 

Scaritinae
Articles created by Qbugbot
Beetles described in 1843
Taxa named by Samuel Stehman Haldeman